Santiago González and Scott Lipsky were the defending champions but decided not to participate together.
González partnered up with Christopher Kas but lost in the Quarterfinals, while Lipsky played alongside Rajeev Ram but lost in the first round.
Mariusz Fyrstenberg and Marcin Matkowski won the tournament defeating Marcel Granollers and Marc López in the final.

Seeds

Draw

Finals

Top half

Bottom half

References
 Main Draw

Doubles